Visakhapatnam – Lokmanya Tilak Terminus Superfast Express is a weekly superfast train service of the Indian Railways running between Visakhapatnam railway station and Mumbai's Lokmanya Tilak Terminus. It was inaugurated on 15 July 2012 as announced in the 2010 rail budget.

Coaches
It has 1 AC 2 tier, 1 AC 3 tier, 8 Sleeper class & 6 General unreserved coaches. As with most train services in India, Coach Composition may be changed at the departure of train depending upon demand.

Service
Visakhapatnam - Mumbai LTT Superfast Express covers the distance of 1650 km in 29 hours 5 mins as 22847 Express averaging 56 km/hr.

Loco
Initially, before 12 February 2014, it was hauled by WDM 3A loco of Visakhapatnam or Erode shed from Vishakhapatnam to Raipur, From Raipur to Igatpuri by WAP4 loco of Bhusaval shed, From Igatpuri to Mumbai LTTby WCAM 2P/3 of Kalyan shed.

As Central Railways progressively complete DC-AC conversion on 12 February 2014, this train is now hauled by a Bhusaval based WAP-4 from Lokmanya Tilak Terminus to Raipur after which a Visakhapatnam-based WDM-3A hauls the train for the remainder of its journey until Visakhapatnam.

References

Transport in Mumbai
Transport in Visakhapatnam
Rail transport in Andhra Pradesh
Rail transport in Odisha
Rail transport in Chhattisgarh
Rail transport in Maharashtra
Railway services introduced in 2012